Gowtam SSC is a 2005 India Telugu-language drama film directed by P.A. Arun Prasad. Navdeep, Sindhu Tolani, Bhanupriya played the lead roles. Music is by Anoop Rubens. Dialogues are by Ramesh and Gopi, cinematography by J Siva Kumar. Sirivennela and CC Reddy penned the lyrics. This film won Nandi award as the third best film in 2005.

Plot
Gowtam is youngest of three sons of Collector Shambhu Prasad. His wife Chaya Rani is a professor, eldest son Manoj is a doctor, second one Neeraj is a businessman, and his daughters-in-law are also in a well-to-do status. But his last son fails to go beyond S.S.C.. Gowtam is more close to his neighbors Dr. Bhanu and Kondal Rao than his family. He is not respected in the family and doesn't have a clear goal in life. He also builds a strong friendship with tutor Janaki, who teaches his brother's kids. Though Mr. Prasad ignores his son's small gaffes, he doesn't spare him when he discovers that Gowtam forged his signature. Enraged, he throws him out of the house. Now homeless, Gowtam is taken by Janaki to her house and falls in love with her. There, he starts working as a mechanic repairing vehicles. He gets inspired by the words of Bhanu and plunges himself into automobile repairing. He invents a carburetor that gives a mileage of 120  km per liter and makes his brother as the patentee for his apparatus. He saves his eldest brother from a conspiracy of hospital management and also fixes the marriage of his sister with her lover. In spite of doing all good to his family, he never lets his father know about these things as his father always wishes to see his third son as an I.A.S. officer. He strives for that and his love is also not informed of his efforts. The movie ends with sharing his triumph with his father.

Cast
 Navdeep as Gowtam Kumar
 Sindhu Tolani as Janaki
 Madhu Sharma as Bhramaramba
 Bhanupriya as Dr. Bhanu
 Ahuti Prasad as Doctor, Chairman of the hospital where Manoj works
 Ravali as sister in law of Gowtam
 Nassar as Shambu Prasad IAS (Gowtam's father)
 Fathima Babu as Chaya Rani (Gowtam's mother)
 Shiju as Manoj (Gowtam's Brother)
 Srinivas Varma Buddharaju as Neeraj (Gowtam's brother)
 Babloo Prithiveeraj as Kondal Rao, Bhanu's husband
 M. S. Narayana
 Gundu Hanumantha Rao as Pandiyan [Chef]
 Raghunatha Reddy
 Dharmavarapu Subramanyam as Garage Owner
 K. Viswanath as Kaloji Rao IAS
 Shanoor Sana
 Abhinaya Krishna

Soundtrack
The music was composed by Anup Rubens and released by Aditya Music. All lyrics were penned by Sirivennela Seetharama Sastry.

Awards
 The film won Nandi Award for Third Best Feature Film Produced by Y. Sonia Reddy (2005)

References 

2000s Telugu-language films
2005 films
Films directed by P. A. Arun Prasad